The 1977 NSL Cup was the first edition of the National Soccer League Cup, which was a national association football (soccer) knockout cup competition in Australia. All 14 NSL teams from around Australia entered the competition and it immediately followed the home and away season, as there was no final series.

First round

Quarter-finals
West Adelaide had a bye for the Quarter-finals.

Semi-finals

Final

Top scorers

References

NSL Cup
1977 in Australian soccer
NSL Cup seasons